The Big Show is a 1936 American Western musical film directed by Mack V. Wright and starring Gene Autry, Kay Hughes, and Smiley Burnette. Written by Dorrell and Stuart E. McGowan, the film is about a singing cowboy who confuses two girls by being himself and his own stunt double at the Texas Centennial in Dallas. Roy Rogers appears in the film as one of the Sons of the Pioneers.

Plot
Western movie star Tom Ford (Gene Autry) is scheduled to make a guest appearance at the Texas Centennial celebration in Dallas. When Ford leaves on vacation intending to miss the celebration, his publicity manager Lee Wilson (William Newell) convinces singing cowboy Gene Autry (Gene Autry) to appear in Tom's place. While driving to Dallas from Hollywood, Gene meets Marion Hill (Kay Hughes) when his trailer collides with her wagon. Marion is also on her way to the centennial, intending to enter her show steer in the Texas Centennial Exposition. Watching Gene skillfully retrieve her cattle, Marion is impressed to see a movie star perform like a true cowboy.

At the Texas Centennial in Dallas, Gene (pretending to be movie star Tom Ford) sings on the radio and becomes a national hit. Studio head Swartz (Charles Judels), hoping to capitalize on the publicity, decides to launch a series of Western musicals starring Tom Ford, even though the real Ford cannot sing a note. When the engagement of Gene (as Tom Ford) and Marion is announced in the newspapers, Ford's real fiancée is infuriated. Meanwhile, gambler Tony Rico (Harry Worth) and his henchmen arrive in Dallas to collect the $10,000 that Tom owes. Wilson is forced to pay the debt, plus $25,000 to keep Rico from revealing Gene's identity. Tom Ford finally shows up and reports to Swartz, but the studio head would rather appease the blackmailers than replace Gene with the talentless Ford.

At the "Cavalcade of Texas" Gene and Marion perform as part of the centennial. When Tom Ford's fiancée shows up, Marion is forced to leave. In order to save his romance with Marion, Gene takes a risk and confesses his true identity over the radio. To his surprise, the audience prefers him to the real Tom Ford. Gene's confession ruins Rico's blackmail attempt, and he and his henchmen escape with the blackmail money by dressing as cowboys and joining the cavalcade act. Gene chases after the outlaws in true western style, eventually arresting them. During the chase, the money is lost in a lagoon by Gene's sidekick, Frog (Smiley Burnette). Sometime later back in Hollywood, Tom Ford is now working as Gene's double. Gene sings to Marion on the set of his new movie, and she and Gene kiss.

Cast
 Gene Autry as Gene Autry / Tom Ford 
 Smiley Burnette as Frog
 Kay Hughes as Marion Hill 
 Sally Payne as Toodles Brown 
 William Newell as Lee Wilson 
 Max Terhune as Ventriloquist 
 Charles Judels as Swartz, the studio head 
 Sons of the Pioneers as Musicians 
 The Jones Boys as Singers 
 The Beverly Hill Billies as Musicians
 Light Crust Doughboys as Musicians
 Champion as Champion, the studio horse 
 Rex King as Fred Collins 
 Harry J. Worth as Tony Rico 
 Mary Russell as Mary
 Christine Maple as Miss Van Every, Ford's Fiancee
 Jerry Larkin as Henchman Blackie
 Jack O'Shea as Henchman Joe
 Wedgwood Nowell as Movie Director
 Antrim Short as Studio Assistant
 June Johnson as Studio Secretary
 Grace Durkin as Studio Girl

Production

Filming locations
The movie was filmed at Fair Park in Dallas, Texas, which served as the location of the 1936 Texas Centennial Exposition; it continues to serve as the location of the Texas State Fair. Many of the buildings in the film still exist in what has been called the largest collection of art deco buildings in the world.
 Fair Park, Dallas, Texas, USA 
 Iverson Ranch, 1 Iverson Lane, Chatsworth, Los Angeles, California, USA 
 Texas State Fairgrounds, 3921 Martin Luther King Jr. Boulevard, Dallas, Texas, USA

Stuntwork 
 Cliff Lyons
 Bill Yrigoyen
 Joe Yrigoyen

Soundtrack
 "The Martins and the Coys" (Ted Weems and Al Cameron) by Gene Autry, Smiley Burnette and The Beverly Hill Billies
 "Travelin' Along" by The Light Crust Dough Boys
 "Mad About You" (Sam H. Stept and Ted Koehler) by Gene Autry and Smiley Burnette
 "Oh! Susanna" (Stephen Foster) played at the Texas Centennial
 "Ride, Ranger, Ride" (Tim Spencer) by the marching Texas Rangers
 "Lady Known as Lulu" (Sam H. Stept and Ned Washington) by The Jones Boys
 "Wild and Wooly West" by Gene Autry, Smiley Burnette, Sally Payne, Sons of the Pioneers, and Max Terhune (through his dummy)
 "Nobody's Darlin' But Mine" (Jimmie Davis) by Gene Autry and Sons of the Pioneers
 "Roll, Wagons, Roll" (Tim Spencer and Carl Winge) by Sons of the Pioneers
 "Ole Faithful" (Michael Carr and Hamilton Kennedy) by Gene Autry

See also
 List of films in the public domain in the United States

References
Notes

Citations

Bibliography

External links
 
 
 
 

1936 films
1930s Western (genre) musical films
American black-and-white films
Films shot in Dallas
Films directed by Mack V. Wright
Republic Pictures films
Films produced by Nat Levine
American Western (genre) musical films
1930s English-language films
1930s American films